An aria is a self-contained expressive melody for one voice usually with orchestral accompaniment.

Aria may also refer to:

Music

Artists
 Aria (band), a Russian heavy-metal band

Albums
 Aria: The Opera Album, 1998 album by Andrea Bocelli
 Aria (Asia album), 1994
 Aria (Gianna Nannini album), 2002
 Aria (Grover Washington Jr. album), 2000

Songs
 "Aria" (song), by Dario Baldan Bembo
 "Aria", a song by Delerium featuring the Mediæval Bæbes
 "Aria", a song by Kalafina
 "Aria", a song by Yanni from Dare to Dream
 "Aria", a song by Hamasaki Ayumi from Love Songs
 "Aria", a song by Susumu Hirasawa
 "ARiA", a song by tokuP (とくP), sung by Hatsune Miku
 "Aria", a song by Oh Hiroshima from In Silence We Yearn

Comics and manga
 Aria (Belgian comic), a fantasy by Michel Weyland that debuted in 1982
 Aria (Image Comics), an American urban fantasy by Brian Holguin and Jay Anacleto, published from 1999 to 2003 by Image Comics
 Aria (manga), a Japanese manga and anime created by Kozue Amano, that debuted in 2001
 Aria (magazine), a Japanese manga magazine published by Kodansha, beginning in 2010
 Aria the Scarlet Ammo, a Japanese light novel, manga, and anime series created by Chūgaku Akamatsu, that debuted in 2008

Film and television
 Aria (1987 film), an anthology film made by ten directors
 Aria (2001 film), an animated short film
 "Aria" (Law & Order), an episode of the TV series

People
 Aria (name), a given name
 Aria (singer), American recording artist, songwriter, and actress

Places
 Aria (Crete), a town of ancient Crete
 Aria (region), a historical region in northwest Afghanistan
 Aria, Argolis, a settlement in the municipality Nafplio, Greece
 Aria, Navarre, a municipality in the autonomous community of Navarre, Spain
 Aria, New Zealand, a locality in the Waitomo District of New Zealand
 Aria Resort and Casino, an American hotel on the Las Vegas Strip, Nevada

Science and technology
 Aria (storage engine), a storage engine for MySQL and MariaDB
 HTC Aria, a phone by HTC Corporation
 Acetylcholine receptor inducing activity, an alternative name for neuregulin type 1
 Amyloid-related imaging abnormalities, a side effect of monoclonal antibody therapies for Alzheimer's disease

Transport
 Aria (French airline), an airline based in Mulhouse, France
 Aria Air, an airline based in Tehran, Iran
 Aria FXE, an automobile produced by Aria group
 Aeroflot Russian International Airlines, a Russian airline
 Tata Aria, an automobile
 Lady Anastasia, formerly Aria, a superyacht, a luxury motor yacht launched in 2001

Fictional characters
 Aria Montgomery, a character from the TV and book series Pretty Little Liars
 Aria, a character from the Japanese media franchise Sister Princess
 Aria, a character from the Japanese anime Saint Seiya Omega
 Aria, a character from the Crypt of the Necrodancer video game
 Aria Pokoteng, the cat title character from the Aria manga
 Aria T'Loak, a character from the Mass Effect series of video games
 Aria Blaze, a character from the animated film Equestria Girls: Rainbow Rocks
 Aria Shichijou, fictional character in the Seitokai Yakuindomo manga series

Other uses
 Aria (guitar company), a manufacturer of guitars
 Aria (month), the seventh month of the Mandaean calendar
 Areia (mythology)
 Aria: Canticle of the Monomyth, a tabletop role-playing game by Last Unicorn Games
 Aria, a subgenus in Sorbus, comprising the whitebeam deciduous trees

See also

 
 ARIA (disambiguation)
 Arias (disambiguation)
 Arya (name)
 Arria (disambiguation)